Kiş, Qişı, Gishi, Guishi, Kish-Kishlak, or Qisi may refer to:
Kiş, Khojavend, Azerbaijan
Kiş, Shaki, Azerbaijan
Qisi, Georgian Grape Variety
Qisi, Huaibin County (期思镇), town in Huaibin County, Henan, China

See also
 Kis (surname)